Kalmunai North Hospital is a government hospital in Kalmunai, Sri Lanka. It is controlled by the central government in Colombo. As of 2010 it had 413 beds. The hospital is sometimes called Kalmunai North Base Hospital.

References

Central government hospitals in Sri Lanka
Kalmunai
Hospitals in Ampara District